David Young (born August 18, 1981) is an American basketball player who graduated from Xavier University and North Carolina Central University and was drafted by the Seattle SuperSonics in the 2004 NBA Draft. He was signed to a contract but waived a month later, before he played in any NBA games.

Career
He played the 2009-2010 season in Trikala 2000 in the Greek League. He has played professionally in Italy for Air Avellino (2005–2006) and Banco di Sardegna Sassari (Serie A2, 2006–2007) and also in the Greek League with Rethymno. In 2007/08 season, he joined France's Élan Béarnais Pau-Orthez. Subsequent to his stint with the Seattle SuperSonics, David played for the NBA's Developmental League (D-League) where he finished the season second in scoring with 18.5ppg. In March 2011, Young signed with a Philippine Basketball Association team, the San Miguel Beermen.

Young is a graduate of New Castle High School in New Castle, Pennsylvania. He has a degree in Criminal Justice from Xavier University. He has one daughter. He is the brother-in-law of Leon Washington, a former player for the NFL's Seattle Seahawks.

References

External links
NBA.com profile

1981 births
Living people
American expatriate basketball people in China
American expatriate basketball people in the Dominican Republic
American expatriate basketball people in France
American expatriate basketball people in Greece
American expatriate basketball people in Italy
American expatriate basketball people in Japan
American expatriate basketball people in Montenegro
American expatriate basketball people in the Philippines
American men's basketball players
Basketball players from Pennsylvania
Dinamo Sassari players
Élan Béarnais players
Fayetteville Patriots players
Jilin Northeast Tigers players
KK Budućnost players
North Carolina Central Eagles men's basketball players
People from New Castle, Pennsylvania
Philippine Basketball Association imports
Rethymno B.C. players
S.S. Felice Scandone players
San Miguel Beermen players
Scafati Basket players
SeaHorses Mikawa players
Seattle SuperSonics draft picks
Shooting guards
Small forwards
Sportspeople from the Pittsburgh metropolitan area
Trikala B.C. players
Xavier Musketeers men's basketball players
Criollos de Caguas basketball players